A psychonaut is a person who explores the psyche by altering their state of consciousness, often through the use of psychoactive substances and other techniques or practices.

Psychonaut may also refer to:

 Psychonauts, a 2005 video game
 Psychonaut (album), a 1972 album by Brainticket
 Psychonauts (band), a British music duo
 Psychonauts, an Epic Comics limited series
 Psychonaut, a 1982 book by Peter J. Carroll
 "Psychonaut", a song by Fields of the Nephilim from the 1991 album Earth Inferno
 Psychonaut Records, a Dutch independent record label
 Birdboy: The Forgotten Children, or Psychonauts, the Forgotten Children, a 2015 Spanish animated film
Psiconautas, an Argentine TV series

See also
Psychonautics, a methodology for describing and explaining the subjective effects of altered states of consciousness, a research cabal in which one voluntarily alters their mental state in order to explore and learn to navigate the accompanying experiences.
Psychonomics, an approach to psychology that aims at discovering the laws that govern the workings of the mind